William Bagguley (9 September 1866 – 18 April 1936) was an English cricketer who played for Derbyshire in 1905.

Bagguley was born in Ruddington, the son of Robert Bagguley, a stocking framework knitter and his wife Martha. Bagguley followed his father's occupation from a young age.

Bagguley made a single first-class appearance for Derbyshire, during the 1905 season, against Sussex. From the lower order, he scored 5 runs in the only innings in which he batted.

Bagguley died in Standard Hill, Nottinghamshire. His brothers, Robert and Percy Bagguley also played cricket, the former for Nottinghamshire and the latter for Nottinghamshire Colts.

References

1866 births
1936 deaths
English cricketers
Derbyshire cricketers
People from Ruddington
Cricketers from Nottinghamshire
Textile workers